Plain clothing may refer to:

 Plain dress, the dress of Anabaptist groups like the Amish
 Undercover operation, an operation to avoid detection